The Tennessee Propellers Scout is an American powered parachute that was designed and produced by Tennessee Propellers of Normandy, Tennessee. The aircraft was introduced in 1999, but is no longer available.

Design and development
Tennessee Propellers is a company better known for their wooden maple laminate aircraft propellers, but the company also acted as the exclusive distributor for the Zenoah G-25 and G-50 line of engines. To complement these product lines they developed the Scout powered parachute which is powered by the  G-50 driving a Tennessee propeller.

It features a parachute-style high-wing, single-place accommodation, tricycle landing gear and a single G-50 engine in pusher configuration. The  Rotax 503 engine was a factory option.

The aircraft carriage is built from powder coated welded 6061-T6 aluminum tubing and is a highly simplified design compared to other powered parachutes. In flight steering is accomplished via foot pedals that actuate the canopy brakes, creating roll and yaw. On the ground the same foot pedals control the nosewheel steering. The main landing gear incorporates fiberglass spring rod suspension. Standard equipment factory provided included a large canopy-stowage bag, electric engine starting, flight instruments and a four-point pilot harness.

The Scout was supplied as a complete ready-to-fly aircraft.

Specifications (Scout)

References

1990s United States ultralight aircraft
Single-engined pusher aircraft
Powered parachutes